{{DISPLAYTITLE:C20H20N2O2}}
The molecular formula C20H20N2O2 (molar mass: 320.385 g/mol, exact mass: 320.1525 u) may refer to:

 Befuraline
 Feprazone

Molecular formulas